Eucalyptus kitsoniana, commonly known as the Gippsland mallee or bog gum, is a species of small tree or mallee and is endemic to Victoria. It has mostly smooth bark, a crown containing juvenile, intermediate and adult leaves, flower buds in groups of seven, white flowers and sessile, cup-shaped to hemispherical fruit.

Description
It has smooth white to grey bark, sometimes with accumulated slabs of rough bark near the base and ribbons of shed bark above. The crown contains a mixture of juvenile, intermediate and adult leaves. Flowering occurs between August and March and the flowers are white.

Taxonomy and naming
Eucalyptus kitsoniana was first formally described in 1916 by Joseph Maiden and the description was published in his book A Critical Revision of the Genus Eucalyptus. The specific epithet honours the geologist Albert Ernest Kitson who was a keen naturalist.

Distribution and habitat
The Gippsland mallee is endemic to Victoria and is found near watercourse inland and on coastal plains, often growing in small, pure stands. It mainly occurs between Yarram and Cape Otway, near Portland and on Wilsons Promontory.

References

kitsoniana
Flora of Victoria (Australia)
Plants described in 1916
Taxa named by Joseph Maiden